M'Clure Bay (variant: McClure Bay) is a Peel Sound waterway in  Qikiqtaaluk Region, Nunavut, Canada. It is located on the western side of Somerset Island, between Aston Bay and Birmingham Bay.

The bay is named in honor of Arctic explorer Sir Robert M'Clure.

References

Mapping

Peel Sound, 
Somerset Island, 
Aston Bay, 
Birmingham Bay, 

Bays of Qikiqtaaluk Region